The Wilds is an American drama streaming television series created by Sarah Streicher for Amazon Prime Video. The series revolves around a group of teenage girls who are left stranded on a deserted island after a plane crash, but are unaware they are the subjects of a social experiment. The cast features Sophia Ali, Reign Edwards, Shannon Berry, Jenna Clause, Mia Healey, Helena Howard, Erana James, Sarah Pidgeon, David Sullivan, Troy Winbush, and Rachel Griffiths. The first season was released on Amazon Prime Video on December 11, 2020, and received positive reviews from critics, with praise for the performances, writing, and plot. In December 2020, the series was renewed for a second season which premiered on May 6, 2022. In July 2022, the series was canceled after two seasons.

Plot
A group of teenage girls from different backgrounds—Fatin Jadmani, Dot Campbell, Martha Blackburn, Rachel Reid, Shelby Goodkind, Nora Reid, Toni Shalifoe, and Leah Rilke—are on an airplane when it crashes into the ocean while en route to Hawaii for the Dawn of Eve program, a young women's empowerment retreat. They survive the crash and find themselves stranded on a deserted island. As the girls work to survive as castaways and learn about each other, they are unaware that they are subjects of a social experiment; the plane crash was staged and their stranding orchestrated by Gretchen Klein, the head of the Dawn of Eve program. The girls' adventures on the island are intercut with flashback scenes about their lives before the crash, and flashforward scenes to an underground bunker where two men claiming to be FBI agents, Daniel Faber and Dean Young, interview the survivors after their supposed rescue.

The second season introduces a group of teenage boys-Kirin O’Conner, Rafael Garcia, Josh Herbert, Seth Novak, Ivan Taylor, Henry Tanaka, Bo Leonard and Scotty Simms- who find themselves in Klein’s second orchestrated crash as part of the Twilight of Adam program. Flashing between their past, lives on the island and questioning by Faber and Young, the boys’ stories come to light while the girls (still being held in the bunker) begin to discover the truth behind their situation and attempt to reach the boys.

Cast and characters

Main

 Sophia Ali as Fatin Jadmani, one of the crash survivors, a rich and promiscuous cellist from Berkeley, California
 Shannon Berry as Dorothy "Dot" Campbell, one of the crash survivors, a tough Texan girl with wilderness survival skills who cared for her dying father
 Jenna Clause as Martha Blackburn, one of the crash survivors, a kind and optimistic animal lover from an Ojibwe reservation in Minnesota
 Reign Edwards as Rachel Reid, one of the crash survivors, an uptight competitive diver from New York who later loses her right hand in a shark attack
 Mia Healey as Shelby Goodkind, one of the crash survivors, a closeted beauty pageant queen from a conservative Christian family in Texas.
 Helena Howard as Nora Reid, one of the crash survivors, Rachel's fraternal twin sister, a quiet and intelligent girl from New York
 Erana James as Toni Shalifoe, one of the crash survivors, Martha's hot-headed and openly lesbian best friend from Minnesota
 Sarah Pidgeon as Leah Rilke, one of the crash survivors, a romantic and obsessive loner from Berkeley, California
 David Sullivan as Daniel Faber, a trauma psychologist who interviews the survivors after they are rescued from the island 
 Troy Winbush as Dean Young, ostensibly an FBI agent, also interviewing the survivors after they are rescued, he is more sympathetic towards the girls 
 Rachel Griffiths as Gretchen Klein, the head of the Dawn of Eve and Twilight of Adam programs.
 Charles Alexander as Kirin O'Conner (season 2), one of the Twilight of Adam crash survivors, a macho lacrosse player
 Zack Calderon as Rafael Garcia (season 2), one of the Twilight of Adam crash survivors, a love-obsessed introvert from Tijuana who goes to school in San Diego
 Nicholas Coombe as Josh Herbert (season 2), one of the Twilight of Adam crash survivors, a dorky and optimistic hypochondriac from San Diego
 Alex Fitzalan as Seth Novak (season 2), one of the Twilight of Adam crash survivors, the friendly and intelligent step-brother to Henry who harbors a dark side
 Miles Gutierrez-Riley as Ivan Taylor (season 2), one of the Twilight of Adam crash survivors, a bold and witty gay teen
 Aidan Laprete as Henry Tanaka (season 2), one of the Twilight of Adam crash survivors, the goth and pessimistic ex-boy scout and step-brother of Seth
 Tanner Ray Rook as Bo Leonard (season 2), one of the Twilight of Adam crash survivors, a sweet and orderly victim of child abuse from Florida
 Reed Shannon as Scotty Simms (season 2), Bo’s protective and entrepreneurial best friend from Florida

Recurring

 James Fraser as Ian Murnen, a friend of Leah’s who has a crush on her
 Jarred Blakiston as Alex, a member of Gretchen's team who is hesitant of her methods
 Jen Huang as Susan, a member of Gretchen's team
 Joe Witkowski as Thom, a member of Gretchen's team
 Barbara Eve Harris as Audrey, a member of Gretchen's team
 Elliott Giarola as Devon Klein (season 2), Gretchen's son who poses as DJ Keating, one of the crash survivors on the boys island

Guest
 Chi Nguyen as Linh Bach, Gretchen's research assistant, who poses as Jeanette Dao, one of the crash survivors, but dies on the first day
 Carter Hudson as Jeffrey Galanis (season 1), an author who Leah has a brief relationship with due to his attraction to younger women. He breaks things off after discovering that Leah lied to him about being 18.
 Greg Bryk as Tim Campbell (season 1), Dot's ailing father
Shane Callahan as James Reid (season 1), Nora and Rachel's father
Ddé Dionne Gipson as Angela Reid (season 1), Nora and Rachel's mother
Jose Velazquez as Mateo (season 1), a nurse who looks after Dot's father and starts developing feelings for her
Bella Shepard as Regan (season 1), Toni's ex-girlfriend
Poorna Jagannathan as Rana Jadmani, Fatin's mother
Alireza Ghadiri as Ahmad Jadmani, Fatin's father
Warren Kole as Dave Goodkind, Shelby's father. He runs bible study sessions and a Christian-themed spin cycle studio.
Stefania LaVie Owen as Becca Gilroy, Shelby's best friend who she secretly has romantic feelings for
Bonnie Soper as JoBeth Goodkind, Shelby's mother
 Kimberly Guerrero as Bernice Blackburn, Martha's mother
Lewis Fitz-Gerald as Dr. Ted Wolchak, a doctor who sexually abused Martha, and several other girls, when she was a child
Johnny Berchtold as Quinn, Nora's ex-boyfriend who she meets during summer session at a college campus
Victoria Moroles as Marisol Nunez (season 2), Rafael’s girlfriend
Ben Folds as himself (season 2), who appears in Leah’s hallucinations

Episodes

Series overview

Season 1 (2020)

Season 2 (2022)

Production

Development
On June 28, 2018, Amazon Studios gave production a pilot order. On August 3, 2018, it was announced that Susanna Fogel had signed on to direct the pilot and serve as executive producer.
On May 28, 2019, it was announced that Amazon Studios had given the production a series order for a first season consisting of ten episodes. The series was developed by Sarah Streicher who is also expected to executive produce alongside Jamie Tarses from Fanfare; and Dylan Clark and Brian Williams of Dylan Clark Productions. It was also announced that Amy B. Harris would be acting as showrunner and executive producer. On December 19, 2020, Amazon Studios renewed the series for a second season. On July 28, 2022, Amazon canceled the series after two seasons.

Casting
On July 31, 2018, Mia Healey, Helena Howard, Reign Edwards, and Shannon Berry were cast as series regulars. On November 7, 2019, Rachel Griffiths, David Sullivan, Troy Winbush, Sophia Ali, Sarah Pidgeon, Jenna Clause, and Erana James joined the main cast. On May 3, 2021, Zack Calderon, Aidan Laprete, Nicholas Coombe, Charles Alexander, Miles Gutierrez-Riley, Reed Shannon, Tanner Ray Rook and Alex Fitzalan were cast in starring roles for the second season.

Filming
Filming for the first season began in October 2019 in New Zealand. Most of the outdoor scenes for the first season were filmed in Bethells Beach, New Zealand. Filming for the second season would relocate from New Zealand to Queensland, Australia and began filming in April 2021. Filming for the second season wrapped in August 2021.

Release
The series's first season was released on December 11, 2020 on Amazon Prime Video. The second season was released on May 6, 2022.

Reception

Critical response
On review aggregator Rotten Tomatoes, the first season received an approval rating of 92% based on 25 critic reviews, with an average rating of 7.30/10. The website's critics consensus reads, "An addictive thriller that also captures the complex lives of teenage girls, The Wilds is worth getting lost in." Metacritic gave the first season a weighted average score of 76 out of 100 based on 11 critic reviews, indicating "generally favorable reviews".

Kristen Baldwin of Entertainment Weekly gave the series a B+ and wrote, "Here, the mystery isn't so much why these girls are on the island as how being there will change them—and I, for one, want to go back." Richard Roeper of Chicago Sun-Times gave the series 3.5 out of 4 stars and said, "What's so impressive about The Wilds is how creator Sarah Streicher and the deeply talented young cast members immerse us in this world so quickly and create an almost instant interest and empathy for these eight teenage girls." The show has received praise from critics and advocacy groups for its diverse cast, which includes indigenous and queer characters, and its "front-and-center" depiction of same-sex relationships.

On Rotten Tomatoes, the second season holds an approval rating of 80% based on 20 critic reviews, with an average rating of 6.6/10. The website's critics consensus states, "The Wilds gets a little lost after expanding its ensemble at the expense of its original hook, but the core cast remains as watchable as ever." The second season received a score of 62 out of 100 on Metacritic based on 9 critics, indicating "generally favorable reviews".

Accolades
The Wilds was nominated for the Outstanding Drama Series category for the GLAAD Media Awards in 2021.

References

External links
 
 
 

2020 American television series debuts
2022 American television series endings
2020s American LGBT-related drama television series
2020s American teen drama television series
English-language television shows
Amazon Prime Video original programming
Television series about being lost from home
Television series about teenagers
Television series by ABC Studios
Television series by Amazon Studios
Television shows about aviation accidents or incidents
Television shows filmed in Australia
Television shows filmed in New Zealand
Television shows set on uninhabited islands
Nonlinear narrative television series